The 2010–11 season of Slovak Third League (also known as 3. liga), was the eighteen season of the fourth-tier football league in Slovakia, since its establishment in 1993.

62 teams were geographically divided into four groups: 3. liga Bratislava (14 teams), 3. liga Západ, 3. liga Stred and 3. liga Východ (16 teams each). Teams were played against teams in their own division only.

From the next season was this league renamed to Majstrovstvá regiónu.

3. liga Bratislava

League table

3. liga Západ

Locations

League table

3. liga Stred

League table

3. liga Východ

Locations

League table

References

External links
 Slovak site Denník Šport 

3
4
Slovak
4. Liga (Slovakia) seasons